Parliamentary elections were held in Macedonia on 15 September 2002. The result was a victory for the Together for Macedonia, an alliance of the Social Democratic Union of Macedonia, the Liberal Democratic Party, the Democratic Party of Turks, the Democratic League of Bosniaks, the United Party of Romas in Macedonia, the Democratic Party of Serbs, the Democratic Union of the Vlachs of Macedonia, the Workers-Peasant Party, the Socialist Christian Party of Macedonia and the Green Party of Macedonia, which won 60 of the 120 seats in the Assembly.

Electoral system
A new electoral law was passed prior to the election, replacing the system in which 35 members of the Assembly were elected by proportional representation at the national level and 85 elected in single member constituencies. In the new system, the country was divided into six constituencies that elected 20 members each by proportional representation. Seats were allocated using the d'Hondt method with an electoral threshold of 5%.

Results

References

Elections in North Macedonia
Macedonia
2002 in the Republic of Macedonia
September 2002 events in Europe